Copap (possibly from Quechua qupa the mineral turquoise and the turquoise color, -p a suffix,) is a mountain in the Cordillera Blanca in the Andes of Peru whose summit reaches about  or  above sea level depending on the source. It is located in Chacas District, Asunción Province, Ancash; in the same massif as Perlilla which belongs to the glacial system of Copap.

In 1998, it was reported to have the longest glacier in the Cordillera Blanca range.

See also 
 Yanacocha

References 

Mountains of Peru
Mountains of Ancash Region
Glaciers of Ancash Region